Raoul Louis du Roveray (1879-1940), was a male badminton player from England.

Badminton career
Du Roveray born in Brentford  was a winner of the All England Open Badminton Championships. He won the 1920 doubles with Archibald Engelbach.

He gained his England caps while playing for Middlesex.

References

English male badminton players
1879 births
1940 deaths